The Arnenhorn is a mountain of the Bernese Alps, located on the border between the Swiss cantons of Vaud and Bern. It overlooks the Arnensee on its eastern side.

References

External links
 Arnenhorn on Hikr

Mountains of the Alps
Bernese Alps
Mountains of Switzerland
Mountains of the canton of Vaud
Mountains of the canton of Bern
Bern–Vaud border
Two-thousanders of Switzerland